Chris Loschetter (born May 24, 1980) is an American professional bowler from Florida, currently on the Professional Bowlers Association (PBA) Tour. Chris attended Florida State University, and was on the bowling team there in the 2002–03 and 2003–04 seasons. He was part of the Junior Team USA from 2000–2001. Since 2003 he has been a member of the PBA Tour. He spent several years on the pro staff for Brunswick before becoming a "free agent" in 2013. As of the 2021 season, he is on the pro staff for MOTIV bowling balls and Vise Grips.

History on the PBA Tour
Chris joined the PBA Tour in 2003. He holds two PBA Tour titles and 15 PBA Regional titles. He has 25 career perfect games in PBA competition, and his highest certified series is an 847. His PBA Tour earnings through the 2019 season are $691,888.

His best year on Tour to date was the 2007–08 season, in which he cashed in 20 events, made match play 14 times, made two TV finals appearances, finished 8th in PBA Tour points, and collected $84,776 in earnings.

Second place
From 2003 to 2012, Loschetter made it to the title match on four occasions, losing all four times as opponents averaged 260.5 against him. He was denied his first major title when he was defeated by Patrick Allen in the final match of the 2004–05 PBA World Championship, 235–210. One of the closest times he came to winning was in 2008 at the Pepsi Championship, when he was the #1 seed going into the title match but got beat by fellow Brunswick pro staff member Brad Angelo, 256–215. Loschetter was also chosen to represent Brunswick at the 2012 PBA Summer Shootout alongside Sean Rash. Although it wouldn’t count as a PBA Tour Title, Loschetter and Rash made the championship match, to face Jason Belmonte and Pete Weber. However, needing a mark and good count to win, Loschetter left the 3-4-6-7 in the 10th frame, and after leaving the four, Team Brunswick lost 244-233.

First PBA Tour title
On June 1, 2013, Chris ended a title drought of nine years and 153 events on the Tour by winning the Lucas Oil PBA Wolf Open in Wauwatosa, WI.  As the #1 qualifier for the event, he only had to bowl one game in the televised final, in which he defeated four-time PBA titleist Bill O'Neill, 264–231. At the time, Chris had the third-longest active streak of PBA events (behind Joe Ciccone and Nathan Bohr) without a win.

Additional accomplishments
Chris won the 2011 Kuwait Open, which at the time did not count as a PBA title. He also owns two European Bowling Tour (EBT) titles. Chris was a member of the 'Merica Rooster Illusion team, which won the PBA Team Challenge title in Las Vegas on November 1, 2016. This counted as his second PBA Tour title.

Loschetter was voted by his PBA Tour peers to receive the Steve Nagy Sportsmanship Award for the 2017 season.

Personal
Loschetter currently resides in Avon, Ohio with his wife Erin, who bowled collegiately at Central Missouri State. The two have a son named Emmett. Chris is a survivor of testicular cancer.

References

1980 births
Living people
American ten-pin bowling players